Interview Island is an island of the Andaman Islands.  It belongs to the North and Middle Andaman administrative district, part of the Indian union territory of Andaman and Nicobar Islands.

History
The lighthouse on the island was affected by the tsunami generated by the 2004 Indian Ocean earthquake which inundated much of its area. The lighthouse was reported as "completely destroyed" at the time, but it was later repaired. Until 2015 there was a wildlife station to monitor birds, with permanent inhabitants located on the west coast near the lighthouse. The station is also staffed with a lighthouse keeper (from the police). It was evacuated at the end of 2015 due to budget being discontinued.

Geography
The island belongs to the Interview Group and is situated to the west of Austen Strait which separates North Andaman Island and Middle Andaman Island. The highest part of the island is a wooded plateau.

Fauna
The island has about 80-90 feral elephants which were brought for forestry works, and still remain on this island.

Administration
Politically, Interview Island, along with the neighbouring Interview Group of islands, is part of Mayabunder Taluk, a sub-district of India.

Transportation
Travel to the island is by dinghy through Austen Strait from Mayabunder, taking 3 hours.

Demographics 
There is only one village, located at the eastern part of the island.
According to the 2011 census of India, the island has one households. The effective literacy rate (i.e. the literacy rate of population excluding children aged 6 and below) is 100%.

The island was opened to tourists in the year 1997, it is entirely abandoned. Just a few forest wardens, policemen and coast guards are posted here in order to keep poachers at a safe distance.

References 

 Geological Survey of India

www.andamanicobarisland.com

 
Cities and towns in North and Middle Andaman district
Islands of North and Middle Andaman district
Islands of the Bay of Bengal
Tourist attractions in the Andaman and Nicobar Islands